1 Jac 1 c 8, commonly known as the Statute of Stabbing, was an Act of the Parliament of England enacted during the reign of James I and repealed in 1828. It provided that if any person stabbed "any person that hath not any weapon drawn or that hath not then first stricken the party", and they died within six months as a result, was to suffer the death penalty without being permitted benefit of clergy. Under the statute, killings subject to benefit of clergy were called manslaughters and required that a defendant prove a "sudden quarrel" or provocation. Deaths resulting from armed attacks that had been planned in advance were called murders. The Act was repealed by section 1 of the Offences against the Person Act 1828 (for England and Wales) and section 125 of the Criminal Law (India) Act 1828 (for India).

References

Further reading
Select statutes and other constitutional documents illustrative of the reigns of Elizabeth and James I, ed. by G. W. Prothero. Oxford University Press, 1913. Fourth edition.
Chronological table of the statutes; HMSO, London. 1993.

1603 in law
1603 in England
Acts of the Parliament of England
Repealed English legislation